The 1892 Tennessee Volunteers football team represented the University of Tennessee in the 1892 season.  The Volunteers embarked on their second season as a full-time squad.  This season saw the Vols win their first game versus Maryville College, in Maryville, Tennessee.  As in 1891, this was a student coached squad, made up of ragtag players. This was the first meeting of UT and Vanderbilt in their in-state rivalry game.

Schedule

References

Tennessee
Tennessee Volunteers football seasons
Tennessee Volunteers football